Cergy-le-Haut is a railway station in Cergy, a Paris suburb. The station was built in 1994 by the Agence des gares (J.-M. Duthilleul, É. Tricaud) and receives trains from Gare Saint-Lazare as well as the RER.

The station is half underground and was built in an area of openland fields, now built upon and is part of the network of stations serving the ville nouvelle of Cergy-Pontoise. It was part of a large project to develop the area and smart Parisian style buildings have been built next to the station around a plaza situated above the tracks. Cergy-le-Haut is not yet fully developed so fields are next to the station and next to seven-storey high apartment buildings.

Patronage is high so during the rush hours it is served by RER trains every ten minutes and by suburban trains every ten minutes. Trains on RER services are usually MI 2N and MI 09 whilst trains on suburban services is Z50000.

See also

 List of stations of the Paris RER

External links
 
Agence des gares 

Réseau Express Régional stations
Railway stations in France opened in 1994
Railway stations in Val-d'Oise